Nonazochis is a monotypic moth genus of the family Crambidae described by Hans Georg Amsel in 1956. It contains only one species, Nonazochis graphialis, described by William Schaus in 1912, which is found in Costa Rica and Honduras.

References

Spilomelinae
Monotypic moth genera
Moths of Central America
Taxa named by Hans Georg Amsel
Crambidae genera